Uglione  is a bairro in the District of Sede in the municipality of Santa Maria, in the Brazilian state of Rio Grande do Sul. It is located in center-west Santa Maria.

Villages 
The bairro contains the following villages: Parque Residencial São Carlos, Uglione, Vila Alegria, Vila Goiânia, Vila São Pedro.

Gallery of photos

References 

Bairros of Santa Maria, Rio Grande do Sul